Visvaldis is a Latvian masculine given name. A diminutive form of Visvaldis is Valdis. People bearing the name Visvaldis include:
Visvaldis (fl. 13th-century), Latgalian nobleman
Visvaldis Ignatāns (born 1991), Latvian footballer
Visvaldis Melderis (1915–1944), Latvian basketball player

References

Latvian masculine given names